

Events

Pre-1600

1336 – Francesco Petrarca (Petrarch) ascends Mont Ventoux.
1348 – Czech king Karel IV founds the Charles University in Prague, which was later named after him and was the first university in Central Europe.
1478 – The Pazzi family attack on Lorenzo de' Medici kills his brother Giuliano during High Mass in Florence Cathedral.
1564 – Playwright William Shakespeare is baptized in Stratford-upon-Avon, Warwickshire, England (date of birth is unknown).

1601–1900
1607 – The Virginia Company colonists make landfall at Cape Henry.
1721 – A massive earthquake devastates the Iranian city of Tabriz.
1777 – Sybil Ludington, aged 16, rode  to alert American colonial forces to the approach of the British regular forces
1794 – Battle of Beaumont during the Flanders Campaign of the War of the First Coalition.
1802 – Napoleon Bonaparte signs a general amnesty to allow all but about one thousand of the most notorious émigrés of the French Revolution to return to France.
1803 – Thousands of meteor fragments fall from the skies of L'Aigle, France; the event convinces European scientists that meteors exist.
1805 – First Barbary War: United States Marines captured Derne under the command of First Lieutenant Presley O'Bannon.
1865 – Union cavalry troopers corner and shoot dead John Wilkes Booth, assassin of President Abraham Lincoln, in Virginia.
1900 – Fires destroy Canadian cities Ottawa and Hull, reducing them to ashes in 12 hours. Twelve thousand people are left without a home.

1901–present
1903 – Atlético Madrid Association football club is founded
1915 – World War I: Italy secretly signs the Treaty of London pledging to join the Allied Powers.
1916 – Easter Rising: Battle of Mount Street Bridge
1920 – Ice hockey makes its Olympic debut at the Antwerp Games with center Frank Fredrickson scoring seven goals in Canada's 12–1 drubbing of Sweden in the gold medal match.
1923 – The Duke of York weds Lady Elizabeth Bowes-Lyon at Westminster Abbey.
1925 – Paul von Hindenburg defeats Wilhelm Marx in the second round of the German presidential election to become the first directly elected head of state of the Weimar Republic.
1933 – The Gestapo, the official secret police force of Nazi Germany, is established by Hermann Göring.
  1933   – Nazi Germany issues the Law Against Overcrowding in Schools and Universities limiting the number of Jewish students able to attend public schools and universities.
1937 – Spanish Civil War: Guernica, Spain, is bombed by German Luftwaffe.
1942 – Benxihu Colliery accident in Manchukuo leaves 1549 Chinese miners dead.
1943 – The Easter Riots break out in Uppsala, Sweden.
1944 – Georgios Papandreou becomes head of the Greek government-in-exile based in Egypt.
  1944   – Heinrich Kreipe is captured by Allied commandos in occupied Crete.
1945 – World War II: Battle of Bautzen: Last successful German tank-offensive of the war and last noteworthy victory of the Wehrmacht.
  1945   – World War II: Filipino troops of the 66th Infantry Regiment, Philippine Commonwealth Army, USAFIP-NL and the American troops of the 33rd and 37th Infantry Division, United States Army are liberated in Baguio and they fight against the Japanese forces under General Tomoyuki Yamashita.
1954 – The Geneva Conference, an effort to restore peace in Indochina and Korea, begins.
  1954   – The first clinical trials of Jonas Salk's polio vaccine begin in Fairfax County, Virginia. 
1956 – , the world's first successful container ship, leaves Port Newark, New Jersey, for Houston, Texas.
1958 – Final run of the Baltimore and Ohio Railroad's Royal Blue from Washington, D.C., to New York City after 68 years, the first U.S. passenger train to use electric locomotives.
1960 – Forced out by the April Revolution, President of South Korea Syngman Rhee resigns after 12 years of dictatorial rule.
1962 – NASA's Ranger 4 spacecraft crashes into the Moon.
  1962   – The British space programme launches its first satellite, the Ariel 1.
1963 – In Libya, amendments to the constitution transform Libya (United Kingdom of Libya) into one national unity (Kingdom of Libya) and allows for female participation in elections.
1964 – Tanganyika and Zanzibar merge to form the United Republic of Tanzania.
1966 – The magnitude 5.1 Tashkent earthquake affects the largest city in Soviet Central Asia with a maximum MSK intensity of VII (Very strong). Tashkent is mostly destroyed and 15–200 are killed.
  1966   – A new government is formed in the Republic of the Congo, led by Ambroise Noumazalaye.
1970 – The Convention Establishing the World Intellectual Property Organization enters into force.
1981 – Dr. Michael R. Harrison of the University of California, San Francisco Medical Center performs the world's first human open fetal surgery.
1982 – Fifty-seven people are killed by former police officer Woo Bum-kon in a shooting spree in South Gyeongsang Province, South Korea.
1986 – The Chernobyl disaster occurs in the Ukrainian Soviet Socialist Republic.
1989 – The deadliest known tornado strikes Central Bangladesh, killing upwards of 1,300, injuring 12,000, and leaving as many as 80,000 homeless.
  1989   – People's Daily publishes the April 26 Editorial which inflames the nascent Tiananmen Square protests.
1991 – Fifty-five tornadoes break out in the central United States. Before the outbreak's end, Andover, Kansas, would record the year's only F5 tornado.
1993 – The Space Shuttle Columbia is launched on mission STS-55 to conduct experiments aboard the Spacelab module.
1994 – China Airlines Flight 140 crashes at Nagoya Airport in Japan, killing 264 of the 271 people on board.
  1994   – South Africa begins its first multiracial election, which is won by Nelson Mandela's African National Congress. 
2002 – Robert Steinhäuser kills 16 at Gutenberg-Gymnasium in Erfurt, Germany before dying of a self-inflicted gunshot.
2005 – Cedar Revolution: Under international pressure, Syria withdraws the last of its 14,000 troop military garrison in Lebanon, ending its 29-year military domination of that country (Syrian occupation of Lebanon).
2015 – Nursultan Nazarbayev is re-elected President of Kazakhstan with 97.7% of the vote.
2018 – American comedian Bill Cosby is convicted of sexual assault.
2019 – Marvel Studios' blockbuster film, Avengers: Endgame, is released, becoming the highest-grossing film of all time, surpassing the previous box office record of Avatar.

Births

Pre-1600

121 – Marcus Aurelius, Roman emperor (d. 180)
757 – Hisham I of Córdoba (d. 796)
 764 – Al-Hadi, Iranian caliph (d. 786)
1284 – Alice de Toeni, Countess of Warwick (d. 1324)
1319 – King John II of France (d. 1364)
1538 – Gian Paolo Lomazzo, Italian painter and academic (d. 1600)
1575 – Marie de' Medici, queen of Henry IV of France (d. 1642)

1601–1900
1647 – William Ashhurst, English banker, Sheriff of London, Lord Mayor of London and politician (d. 1720)
1648 – Peter II of Portugal (d. 1706)
1697 – Adam Falckenhagen, German lute player and composer (d. 1754)
1710 – Thomas Reid, Scottish philosopher and academic (d. 1796)
1718 – Esek Hopkins, American commander (d. 1802)
1774 – Christian Leopold von Buch, German geologist and paleontologist (d. 1853)
1782 – Maria Amalia of Naples and Sicily, Queen of France (d. 1866)
1785 – John James Audubon, French-American ornithologist and painter (d. 1851)
1787 – Ludwig Uhland, German poet, philologist, and historian (d. 1862)
1798 – Eugène Delacroix, French painter and lithographer (d. 1863)
1801 – Ambrose Dudley Mann, American politician and diplomat, 1st United States Assistant Secretary of State (d. 1889)
1804 – Charles Goodyear, American banker, lawyer, and politician (d. 1876)
1822 – Frederick Law Olmsted, American journalist and designer, co-designed Central Park (d. 1903)
1834 – Charles Farrar Browne, American author (d. 1867)
1856 – Joseph Ward, Australian-New Zealand businessman and politician, 17th Prime Minister of New Zealand (d. 1930)
1862 – Edmund C. Tarbell, American painter and educator (d. 1938)
1865 – Akseli Gallen-Kallela, Finnish artist (d. 1931)
1876 – Ernst Felle, German rower (d. 1959)
1877 – James Dooley, Irish-Australian politician, 21st Premier of New South Wales (d. 1950)
1878 – Rafael Guízar y Valencia, Mexican bishop and saint (d. 1938)
1879 – Eric Campbell, British actor (d. 1917)
  1879   – Owen Willans Richardson, English physicist and academic, Nobel Prize laureate (d. 1959)
1886 – Ma Rainey, American singer-songwriter (d. 1939)
  1886   – Ğabdulla Tuqay, Russian poet and publicist (d. 1913)
1889 – Anita Loos, American author, playwright, and screenwriter (d. 1981)
  1889   – Ludwig Wittgenstein, Austrian-English philosopher and academic (d. 1951)
1894 – Rudolf Hess, Egyptian-German politician (d. 1987)
1896 – Ruut Tarmo, Estonian actor and director (d. 1967)
  1896   – Ernst Udet, German colonel and pilot (d. 1941)
1897 – Eddie Eagan, American boxer and bobsledder (d. 1967)
  1897   – Douglas Sirk, German-American director and screenwriter (d. 1987)
1898 – Vicente Aleixandre, Spanish poet and author, Nobel Prize laureate (d. 1984)
  1898   – John Grierson, Scottish director and producer (d. 1972)
1899 – Oscar Rabin, Latvian-English saxophonist and bandleader (d. 1958)
1900 – Eva Aschoff, German bookbinder and calligrapher (d. 1969)
  1900   – Charles Francis Richter, American seismologist and physicist (d. 1985)
  1900   – Hack Wilson, American baseball player (d. 1948)

1901–present
1904 – Paul-Émile Léger, Canadian cardinal (d. 1991)
  1904   – Xenophon Zolotas, Greek economist and politician, 177th Prime Minister of Greece (d. 2004)
1905 – Jean Vigo, French director and screenwriter (d. 1934)
1907 – Ilias Tsirimokos, Greek politician, Prime Minister of Greece (d. 1968)
1909 – Marianne Hoppe, German actress (d. 2002)
1910 – Tomoyuki Tanaka, Japanese screenwriter and producer (d. 1997)
1911 – Paul Verner, German soldier and politician (d. 1986)
1912 – A. E. van Vogt, Canadian-American author (d. 2000)
1914 – Bernard Malamud, American novelist and short story writer (d. 1986) 
  1914   – James Rouse, American real estate developer (d. 1996)
1916 – Eyvind Earle, American artist, author, and illustrator (d. 2000)
  1916   – Ken Wallis, English commander, engineer, and pilot (d. 2013)
  1916   – Morris West, Australian author and playwright (d. 1999)
1917 – Sal Maglie, American baseball player and coach (d. 1992)
  1917   – I. M. Pei, Chinese-American architect, designed the National Gallery of Art and Bank of China Tower (d. 2019)
  1917   – Virgil Trucks, American baseball player and coach (d. 2013)
1918 – Fanny Blankers-Koen, Dutch sprinter and long jumper (d. 2004)
1921 – Jimmy Giuffre, American clarinet player, saxophonist, and composer (d. 2008)
1922 – J. C. Holt, English historian and academic (d. 2014)
  1922   – Jeanne Sauvé, Canadian journalist and politician, Governor General of Canada (d. 1993)
  1922   – Margaret Scott, South African-Australian ballerina and choreographer (d. 2019)
1924 – Browning Ross, American runner and soldier (d. 1998)
1925 – Vladimir Boltyansky, Russian mathematician, educator and author (d. 2019)
  1925   – Gerard Cafesjian, American businessman and philanthropist (d. 2013)
  1925   – Michele Ferrero, Italian entrepreneur (d. 2015)
  1925   – Frank Hahn, British economist (d. 2013)
1926 – Michael Mathias Prechtl, German soldier and illustrator (d. 2003)
1927 – Jack Douglas, English actor (d. 2008)
  1927   – Anne McLaren, British scientist (d. 2007)
  1927   – Harry Gallatin, American basketball player and coach (d. 2015)
  1927   – Granny Hamner, American baseball player (d. 1993)
1929 – Richard Mitchell, American author and educator (d. 2002)
1930 – Roger Moens, Belgian runner and sportscaster
1931 – Paul Almond, Canadian director, producer, and screenwriter (d. 2015)
  1931   – Bernie Brillstein, American talent agent and producer (d. 2008)
  1931   – John Cain Jr., Australian politician, 41st Premier of Victoria (d. 2019)
1932 – Israr Ahmed, Indian-Pakistani theologian, philosopher, and scholar (d. 2010)
  1932   – Shirley Cawley, English long jumper
  1932   – Frank D'Rone, American singer and guitarist (d. 2013)
  1932   – Francis Lai, French accordion player and composer (d. 2018)
  1932   – Michael Smith, English-Canadian biochemist and geneticist, Nobel Prize laureate (d. 2000)
1933 – Carol Burnett, American actress, singer, and producer
  1933   – Filiberto Ojeda Ríos, Puerto Rican-American general (d. 2005)
  1933   – Arno Allan Penzias, German-American physicist and academic, Nobel Prize laureate
1937 – Jean-Pierre Beltoise, French racing driver and motorcycle racer (d. 2015)
1938 – Duane Eddy, American singer-songwriter, guitarist, and actor
  1938   – Maurice Williams, American doo-wop/R&B singer-songwriter
1940 – Molvi Iftikhar Hussain Ansari, Indian cleric and politician (d. 2014)
  1940   – Giorgio Moroder, Italian singer-songwriter and producer
  1940   – Cliff Watson, English rugby league player (d. 2018)
1941 – Claudine Auger, French model and actress (d. 2019)
1942 – Svyatoslav Belza, Russian journalist, author, and critic (d. 2014)
  1942   – Sharon Carstairs, Canadian lawyer and politician, Leader of the Government in the Senate
  1942   – Michael Kergin, Canadian diplomat, Canadian Ambassador to the United States
  1942   – Bobby Rydell, American singer and actor (d. 2022)
  1942   – Jadwiga Staniszkis, Polish sociologist, political scientist, and academic
1943 – Gary Wright, American singer-songwriter, keyboard player, and producer 
  1943   – Peter Zumthor, Swiss architect and academic, designed the Therme Vals
1944 – Richard Bradshaw, English conductor (d. 2007)
1945 – Howard Davies, English director and producer (d. 2016)
  1945   – Dick Johnson, Australian racing driver
  1945   – Sylvain Simard, Canadian academic and politician
1946 – Ralph Coates, English international footballer (d. 2010)
  1946   – Marilyn Nelson, American poet and author
  1946   – Alberto Quintano, Chilean footballer
1949 – Carlos Bianchi, Argentinian footballer and manager
  1949   – Jerry Blackwell, American wrestler (d. 1995)
1951 – John Battle, English politician
1954 – Tatyana Fomina, Estonian chess player
  1954   – Alan Hinkes, English mountaineer and explorer
1955 – Kurt Bodewig, German politician
1956 – Koo Stark, American actress and photographer
1958 – John Crichton-Stuart, 7th Marquess of Bute, Scottish racing driver (d. 2021)
  1958   – Giancarlo Esposito, American actor, director, and producer
  1958   – Georgios Kostikos, Greek footballer, coach, and manager
1959 – John Corabi, American singer-songwriter and guitarist 
  1959   – Pedro Pierluisi, Puerto Rican politician 
1960 – H. G. Carrillo, American writer and academic (d. 2020)
  1960   – Steve Lombardozzi, American baseball player and coach
  1960   – Roger Taylor, English drummer 
1961 – Joan Chen, Chinese-American actress, director, producer, and screenwriter
  1961   – Chris Mars, American artist
1962 – Colin Anderson, English footballer
  1962   – Debra Wilson, American actress and comedian
1963 – Jet Li, Chinese-Singaporean martial artist, actor, and producer
  1963   – Colin Scotts, Australian-American football player
  1963   – Cornelia Ullrich, German hurdler
  1963   – Bill Wennington, Canadian basketball player
1965 – Susannah Harker, English actress
  1965   – Kevin James, American actor and comedian 
1967 – Glenn Thomas Jacobs, American professional wrestler, actor, businessman and politician 
  1967   – Marianne Jean-Baptiste, English actress and singer-songwriter
  1967   – Toomas Tõniste, Estonian sailor and politician
1970 – Dean Austin, English footballer and manager
  1970   – Melania Trump, Slovene-American model; 47th First Lady of the United States
  1970   – Kristen R. Ghodsee, American ethnographer and academic
  1970   – Tionne "T-Boz" Watkins, American singer-songwriter, dancer, and actress
  1971   – Naoki Tanaka, Japanese comedian and actor
1971 – Jay DeMarcus, American bass player, songwriter, and producer 
1972 – Jason Bargwanna, Australian racing driver
  1972   – Kiko, Spanish footballer
  1972   – Natrone Means, American football player and coach
  1972   – Avi Nimni, Israeli footballer and manager
1973 – Geoff Blum, American baseball player and sportscaster
  1973   – Jules Naudet, French-American director and producer
  1973   – Chris Perry, English footballer
  1973   – Óscar, Spanish footballer and coach
1975 – Joey Jordison, American musician and songwriter (d. 2021)
  1975   – Rahul Verma, Indian social worker and activist 
1976 – Luigi Panarelli, Italian footballer
  1976   – Václav Varaďa, Czech ice hockey player
1977 – Samantha Cristoforetti, Italian astronaut
  1977   – Kosuke Fukudome, Japanese baseball player
  1977   – Roxana Saberi, American journalist and author
  1977   – Tom Welling, American actor
1978 – Stana Katic, Canadian actress 
  1978   – Peter Madsen, Danish footballer
1980 – Jordana Brewster, Panamanian-American actress
  1980   – Marlon King, English footballer
  1980   – Anna Mucha, Polish actress and journalist
  1980   – Channing Tatum, American actor and producer
1981 – Caro Emerald, Dutch pop and jazz singer
  1981   – Ms. Dynamite, English rapper and producer
  1981   – Sandra Schmitt, German skier (d. 2000)
1982 – Novlene Williams-Mills, Jamaican sprinter
1983 – José María López, Argentinian racing driver
  1983   – Jessica Lynch, American soldier
1985 – John Isner, American tennis player
  1985   – Andrea Koch Benvenuto, Chilean tennis player
1986 – Lior Refaelov, Israeli footballer
  1986   – Yuliya Zaripova, Russian runner
1987 – Jorge Andújar Moreno, Spanish footballer
1988 – Ben Spina, Australian rugby league player
  1988   – Manuel Viniegra, Mexican footballer
  1988   – Gareth Evans, English footballer
1989 – Melvin Ingram, American football player
  1989   – Kang Daesung, South Korean singer
1990 – Mitch Rein, Australian rugby league player
  1990   – Nevin Spence, Northern Irish rugby player (d. 2012)
1991 – Lazaros Fotias, Greek footballer
  1991   – Peter Handscomb, Australian cricketer
  1991   – Isaac Liu, New Zealand rugby league player
  1991   – Ignacio Lores Varela, Uruguayan footballer
  1991   – Srdjan Pejicic, Canadian/Bosnian basketball player
  1991   – Wojciech Pszczolarski, Polish bicycle racer
1992 – Aaron Judge, American baseball player
  1992   – Delon Wright, American basketball player
1994 – Daniil Kvyat, Russian racing driver
1996 – Jordan Pefok, American footballer
2001 – Thiago Almada, Argentine footballer
2002 – Meagan Best, Barbadian squash player

Deaths

Pre-1600
 499 – Emperor Xiaowen of Northern Wei (b. 467)
 645 – Richarius, Frankish monk and saint (b. 560)
 680 – Muawiyah I, Umayyad caliph (b. 602)
757 – Pope Stephen II (b. 715)
 893 – Chen Jingxuan, general of the Tang Dynasty
 962 – Adalbero I, bishop of Metz
1192 – Emperor Go-Shirakawa of Japan (b. 1127)
1366 – Simon Islip, Archbishop of Canterbury
1392 – Jeong Mong-ju, Korean civil minister, diplomat and scholar (b. 1338) 
1444 – Robert Campin, Flemish painter (b. 1378)
1478 – Giuliano de' Medici, Italian ruler (b. 1453)
1489 – Ashikaga Yoshihisa, Japanese shōgun (b. 1465)
1558 – Jean Fernel, French physician (b. 1497)

1601–1900
1686 – Magnus Gabriel De la Gardie, Swedish statesman and military man (b. 1622)
1716 – John Somers, 1st Baron Somers, English jurist and politician, Lord High Chancellor of Great Britain (b. 1651)
1784 – Nano Nagle, Irish nun and educator, founded the Presentation Sisters (b. 1718)
1789 – Petr Ivanovich Panin, Russian general (b. 1721)
1809 – Bernhard Schott, German music publisher (b. 1748)
1865 – John Wilkes Booth, American actor, assassin of Abraham Lincoln (b. 1838)
1881 – Ludwig Freiherr von und zu der Tann-Rathsamhausen, German general (b. 1815)
1895 – Eric Stenbock, Estonian-English author and poet (b. 1860)

1901–present
1910 – Bjørnstjerne Bjørnson, Norwegian-French author, poet, and playwright, Nobel Prize laureate (b. 1832)
1915 – John Bunny, American actor (b. 1863)
  1915   – Ida Hunt Udall, American diarist (b. 1858)
1916 – Mário de Sá-Carneiro, Portuguese poet and writer (b. 1890)
1920 – Srinivasa Ramanujan, Indian mathematician and theorist (b. 1887)
1932 – William Lockwood, English cricketer (b. 1868)
1934 – Arturs Alberings, Latvian politician, former Prime Minister of Latvia (b. 1876)
1940 – Carl Bosch, German chemist and engineer, Nobel Prize laureate (b. 1874)
1944 – Violette Morris, French footballer, shot putter, and discus thrower (b. 1893)
1945 – Sigmund Rascher, German physician (b. 1909)
  1945   – Pavlo Skoropadskyi, German-Ukrainian general and politician, Hetman of Ukraine (b. 1871)
1946 – James Larkin White, American miner, explorer, and park ranger (b. 1882)
1950 – George Murray Hulbert, American lawyer, judge, and politician (b. 1881)
1951 – Arnold Sommerfeld, German physicist and academic (b. 1868)
1956 – Edward Arnold, American actor (b. 1890)
1957 – Gichin Funakoshi, Japanese martial artist, founded Shotokan (b. 1868)
1964 – E. J. Pratt, Canadian poet and author (b. 1882)
1968 – John Heartfield, German illustrator and photographer (b. 1891)
1969 – Morihei Ueshiba, Japanese martial artist, founded aikido (b. 1883)
1970 – Erik Bergman, Swedish minister and author (b. 1886)
  1970   – Gypsy Rose Lee, American actress, striptease dancer, and writer (b. 1911)
1973 – Irene Ryan, American actress and philanthropist (b. 1902)
1976 – Sidney Franklin, American bullfighter (b. 1903)
  1976   – Sid James, South African-English actor (b. 1913)
  1976   – Armstrong Sperry, American author and illustrator (b. 1897)
1980 – Cicely Courtneidge, Australian-born British actress, comedian and singer (b. 1893)
1981 – Jim Davis, American actor (b. 1909)
1984 – Count Basie, American pianist, composer, and bandleader (b. 1904)
1986 – Broderick Crawford, American actor (b. 1911)
  1986   – Bessie Love, American actress (b. 1898)
  1986   – Dechko Uzunov, Bulgarian painter (b. 1899)
1987 – Shankar, Indian composer and conductor (b. 1922)
  1987   – John Silkin, English lawyer and politician, Shadow Leader of the House of Commons (b. 1923)
1989 – Lucille Ball, American model, actress, comedian, and producer (b. 1911)
1991 – Leo Arnaud, French-American composer and conductor (b. 1904)
  1991   – Carmine Coppola, American composer and conductor (b. 1910)
  1991   – A. B. Guthrie, Jr., American novelist and historian, (b. 1901)
  1991   – Richard Hatfield, Canadian lawyer and politician, 26th Premier of New Brunswick (b. 1931)
1994 – Masutatsu Ōyama, Japanese martial artist, founded Kyokushin kaikan (b. 1923)
1996 – Stirling Silliphant, American screenwriter and producer (b. 1918)
1999 – Adrian Borland, English singer-songwriter, guitarist, and producer (b. 1957)
  1999   – Jill Dando, English journalist and television personality (b. 1961)
2003 – Rosemary Brown, Jamaican-Canadian academic and politician (b. 1930)
  2003   – Yun Hyon-seok, South Korean poet and author (b. 1984) 
  2003   – Edward Max Nicholson, Irish environmentalist, co-founded the World Wide Fund for Nature (b. 1904)
2004 – Hubert Selby, Jr., American author, poet, and screenwriter (b. 1928)
2005 – Mason Adams, American actor (b. 1919)
  2005   – Elisabeth Domitien, Prime Minister of the Central African Republic (b. 1925)
  2005   – Maria Schell, Austrian-Swiss actress (b. 1926)
  2005   – Augusto Roa Bastos, Paraguayan journalist, author, and academic (b. 1917)
2007 – Jack Valenti, American businessman, created the MPAA film rating system (b. 1921)
2008 – Árpád Orbán, Hungarian footballer (b. 1938)
2009 – Hans Holzer, Austrian-American paranormal investigator and author (b. 1920)
2010 – Mariam A. Aleem, Egyptian graphic designer and academic (b. 1930)
  2010   – Urs Felber, Swiss engineer and businessman (b. 1942)
2011 – Phoebe Snow, American singer-songwriter and guitarist (b. 1950)
2012 – Terence Spinks, English boxer and trainer (b. 1938)
2013 – Jacqueline Brookes, American actress and educator (b. 1930)
  2013   – George Jones, American singer-songwriter and guitarist (b. 1931)
2014 – Gerald Guralnik, American physicist and academic (b. 1936)
  2014   – Paul Robeson, Jr., American historian and author (b. 1927)
  2014   – DJ Rashad, American electronic musician, producer and DJ  (b. 1979)
2015 – Jayne Meadows, American actress (b. 1919)
  2015   – Marcel Pronovost, Canadian ice hockey player and coach (b. 1930)
2016 – Harry Wu, Chinese human rights activist (b. 1937)
2017 – Jonathan Demme, American filmmaker, producer and screenwriter (b. 1944)
  2022   – Klaus Schulze, German composer and musician (b. 1947)

Holidays and observances
Chernobyl disaster related observances:
Day of Remembrance of the Chernobyl tragedy (Belarus) 
Memorial Day of Radiation Accidents and Catastrophes (Russia)
Christian feast day:
Aldobrandesca (or Alda)
Franca Visalta
Lucidius of Verona
Our Lady of Good Counsel
Pope Anacletus and Marcellinus
Rafael Arnáiz Barón
Riquier
Paschasius Radbertus
Peter of Rates (or of Braga) 
Robert Hunt (Episcopal Church (USA))
Stephen of Perm, see also Old Permic Alphabet Day
Trudpert
April 26 (Eastern Orthodox liturgics)
Confederate Memorial Day (Florida, United States)
Union Day (Tanzania)
World Intellectual Property Day

References

External links

 BBC: On This Day
 
 Historical Events on April 26

Days of the year
April